The 1951 Ole Miss Rebels football team represented the University of Mississippi during the 1951 college football season.

Schedule

Roster
FB Arnold Boykin
QB Rocky Byrd
QB Jimmy Lear

References

Ole Miss
Ole Miss Rebels football seasons
Ole Miss Rebels football